"Whispering" is a popular song, first published in 1920 by Sherman, Clay & Co., of San Francisco. The initial 1920 copyright and first publishing attributes the lyrics to Malvin Schonberger and the music to John Schonberger.

Initial and enduring popularity 
"Whispering" was recorded by Paul Whiteman and his Ambassador Orchestra on August 23, 1920, for the Victor Talking Machine Company.  His version was an eleven-week No. 1 hit in the United States, which stayed 20 weeks in the charts, and sold in excess of two million copies. In 2020, Whiteman's rendition was selected by the Library of Congress for preservation in the National Recording Registry for being "culturally, historically, or aesthetically significant".

The song charted twice in the 1960s.  In 1963, Irish singers the Bachelors had a hit with their version which went to the Top 20 in the UK. In 1964, after recording their hit "Deep Purple", American brother and sister singers Nino Tempo and April Stevens had a new hit with "Whispering".  This version went to number eleven on the Hot 100 and number four on the Easy Listening chart.

According to Allmusic, there have been over 700 versions of the song.  As of 2010, on the online music site , there were 161 listed albums or singles containing the song "Whispering".  As of 2014, TJD Online, the online version of The Jazz Discography, listed 225 recording sessions, beginning with Ray Miller and his Black and White Melody Boys, who recorded it on about July 16, 1920, Okeh 4167-A.  Also, as of 2014, TJD Online listed 281 recording sessions of Dizzy Gillespie's composition, "Groovin' High", a contrafact variation of "Whispering".

Compositional structure 
"Whispering", originally scored in E  major, is in  time.  It has a 12-bar intro, the last 4 of which is an optional vamp — then a 16-bar A-theme is followed by a 32-bar repeated chorus.  The 32 bars is essentially a 16-bar B-theme played twice — or 4 times with the repeat.

Dizzy's 1945 composition, "Groovin' High", is a contrafact of "Whispering".  Following a standard practice in jazz, Diz front-ran the static V7 chords with ii7 chords (a "static chord" is a chord that doesn't change), setting up a series of ii7–V7 progressions, which creates more structure for improvising.  The ii7 chord has similar properties to a iv chord (as in the iv–V progression of church harmony). Because "Groovin' High" was a contrafact, performers, publishers, and record companies did not have to pay royalties to the original composers.  Moreover, the contrafacted rendition followed a unified bebop convention — a series of ii7–V7 chord changes with a ii7–V7–I7 turnaround — for jazz artists.

Selected discography 

 George Gershwin (piano roll), Mel-O-Dee 4007
 Recorded September 1919
 Gershwin arranged this as a set of variations for piano

 Paul Whiteman and His Ambassador Orchestra, Victor 18690-A (1920);  [Vocalist: John Steel]
 Recorded August 23, 1920, in Camden, New Jersey (audio)

 Comedian Harmonists (1934)
 Recorded in 1934 in Berlin
 "Whispering", arranged by Bernhard Christensen
 Male vocal quintet with piano 
 Ari Leschnikoff (de) (1897–1978) (tenor), Erich A. Collin (de) (1899–1961) (tenor), Harry Frommermann (de) (1906–1975) (tenor), Roman Cycowski (de) (1901–1998) (baritone), Robert Biberti (de) (1902–1985) (bass), Erwin Bootz (de) (1907–1982) (piano)
 Re-release: ASV Records CDAJA 5204, Living Era (imprint);  (audio)

 The Dorsey Brothers, Associated Broadcasting Company transcription disc (released to radio only)
 Recorded February 1, 1935, in New York City
 "Whispering" (part of a medley)

 Benny Goodman Quartet, Victor 25481 (1936); 
 Benny Goodman (clarinet), Lionel Hampton (vibes), Teddy Wilson (piano), Gene Krupa (drums)
 Recorded December 2, 1936, in New York City
 03515-1 (matrix) – "Whispering"
 Goodman went on to record it 8 more times, twice in 1938, 1953, 1958, twice in 1959, 1967, and 1980

 Tommy Dorsey And His Sentimentalists with Frank Sinatra and The Pied Pipers, Bluebird B-10771 (1940); 
 Recorded June 13, 1940, in New York City
 Bunny Berigan, Jimmy Blake (trumpets); Tommy Dorsey (trombone, leader); Johnny Mince (clarinet); Fred Stulce, Hymie Schertzer (alto saxes); Don Lodice, Paul Mason (tenor saxes); Joe Bushkin (piano); Sid Weiss (bass); Buddy Rich (drums); Frank Sinatra, Pied Pipers (vocals); Sy Oliver (arranger)
 051279-1 (matrix) "Whispering"
 Tommy Dorsey recorded it 8 other times, once in 1933 while playing with Red McKenzie's band, 5 times in 1940, and twice in 1944

 Boris Vian (French author and jazz-trompettist) records his version "Ah, si j'avais un franc cinquante" ("Oh, if I only had 1,5 dollar") with lyrics, this recording is published as a single (which only sells 500 copies) but in the following years becomes a classic.
 Harry Belafonte with Pete Rugolo And His Orchestra Capitol 856; 
 Recorded from March 24 to April 3, 1949, Hollywood, California
 4322-4D-1 (matrix) – "Whispering"
 Belafonte recorded this song during the first year of his recording career

 The Miles Davis Sextet, Prestige 742 (1951);  (original release)
 Miles Davis (trumpet), Bennie Green (trombone), Sonny Rollins (tenor sax), John Lewis (piano), Percy Heath (bass), Roy Haynes (drums)
 Recorded January 17, 1951, in New York City
 131-A (matrix) – "Whispering"
 Miles recorded it again in 1961; he recorded "Groovin' High" 5 times in 1948

 Les Paul and Mary Ford, The Hit Makers!, Capitol, C. 1748 (Netherlands), CL. 13596 (Italy), F1748 (USA), CP-199 (1951); 
 7864 (matrix) – "Whispering"

 Oscar Peterson (1951) (transcription disc, CBC Transcription Service
 Recorded March 8, 1951
 Oscar Peterson (piano), Austin Roberts (bass)
 Many re-issues;  (re-issue)

 Bing Crosby for his album Bing with a Beat (1957)
 Pasadena Roof Orchestra, Review, Transatlantic (E)TRA335 (1976)
 Recorded in London in 1976
 "Whispering" (cover version)
 Selections from this album have been released on dozens of other albums

 Benny Carter Meets Oscar Peterson, Pablo 2310-926 (1987); 
 Benny Carter (alto sax), Oscar Peterson (piano), Joe Pass (guitar), Dave Young (bass), Martin Drew (drums)
 Recorded November 14, 1986, in Hollywood, California

 Al Jarreau, Accentuate the Positive, Verve B0001634-02 (2004); 
 Recorded at Capitol Recording Studios, Hollywood, California
 "Groovin' High" + "Whispering"

Selected filmography 
 1941: Ziegfeld Girl, sung by a male trio
 1944: Greenwich Village, starring Don Ameche, sung by Vivian Blaine
 1945: The Clock, sung by a chorus
 1952: Belles on Their Toes
 1956: The Eddy Duchin Story, performed by Carmen Cavallaro
 2016: The Matchbreaker, performed by Christina Grimmie

Accolades 
 1972: Music Hall of Fame inducted "Whispering" as one of the 10 historic songs.
 1998 Grammy Hall of Fame inductee.

See also 
 Frank Sinatra & the Tommy Dorsey Orchestra (album), recorded 1940 (audio)
 The Song Is You (album), recorded 1940
 The Complete RCA Victor Small Group Recordings (album), recorded 1935–1939
 Benny Carter Meets Oscar Peterson (album), recorded 1986 
 Chet Atkins' Workshop (album), recorded 1960
 Not Necessarily Acoustic (album), recorded 1994
 Pop + Jazz = Swing (album), recorded 1962
 Accentuate the Positive (album), recorded 2004
 "Cherchez La Femme", song variation of "Whispering"
 West Coast Live, Chet Baker & Stan Getz, recorded 1953
 "Groovin' High", jazz standard based on the chord changes of "Whispering" (audio)
 The Bachelors and 16 Great Songs, recorded 1964

Copyrights 

 Sherman, Clay & Co., San Francisco
 Lyrics by Malvin Schonberger, music by John Schonberger
 © July 22, 1920; 2nd copy July 27, 1920, Class E 486556, Sherman, Clay & Co., San Francisco
 © Renewal 21201 July 22, 1947, by John Schonberger & Malvin Schonberger
 © Renewal 25563 July 28, 1947, by John Schonberger, Amelia Rose (widow of Vincent Rose), and Richard Coburn
 © Assigned to Miller Music Corporation July 28, 1947, by Richard Coburn and Amelia Rose (widow of the late Vincent Rose)
 © Claimed by Fred Fisher Music Co. to acquired the rights from John Schonberger in 1938; claim was litigated in U.S. District Court, New York
 Notes:
 The July 22, 1947, renewal attributes the music to John Schonberger and the lyrics to Malvin Schonberger
 The July 27, 1947, renewal attributes the music to John Schonberger and Vincent Rose and the lyrics to Richard Coburn

References 

1920 songs
1920 singles
American songs
Songs written by Vincent Rose
United States National Recording Registry recordings
The Bachelors songs